Lauren Wendy Sánchez (born December 19, 1969) is an American media personality who gained fame as an entertainment reporter and news anchor. She has been a guest host on The View, co-host on KTTV Fox 11's Good Day LA and anchor on the Fox 11 Ten O'clock News, and anchor and special correspondent on
Extra.  Sánchez has also been a regular contributor on shows including Larry King Live, The Joy Behar Show and Showbiz Tonight.

Career
Sánchez began her career as a desk assistant at KCOP-TV in Los Angeles. She also held positions as an anchor and reporter at KTVK-TV in Phoenix before joining the syndicated entertainment show Extra as a reporter. From there, Sánchez moved to Fox Sports Net, where she earned another Emmy nomination as anchor and correspondent for the sports magazine Going Deep and entertainment reporter for FSN's Best Damn Sports Show Period.

In 1999, Sánchez returned to KCOP-TV to anchor UPN 13 News, where she won an Emmy Award. Sánchez also landed the entertainment reporting gig for FOX 11's 10 p.m. news on KTTV in L.A. She was the runner-up in the nationwide hosting competition during season 2 of The View in February 2000. The position was ultimately given to Lisa Ling. In 2005, Sánchez became the original host of FOX's popular dancing competition So You Think You Can Dance. Sánchez left the show after one season to have her second child. In 2009, Sánchez returned to Extra as weekend anchor and special correspondent. Sánchez continues to occasionally work on Good Day LA, Extra and other TV shows.

Sánchez was featured in People magazine's "50 Most Beautiful" issue in 2010 and Us Weekly'''s "Hot Bodies" issue. 

In 2016, she founded Black Ops Aviation, the first female-owned aerial film and production company. Sánchez now focuses on film and television projects which allow her to use her skills as a licensed pilot of airplanes and helicopters.

She foresees to fly to space early 2024 with an all-female crew on board a New Shepard.

Personal life

Lauren Wendy Sánchez was born to a second-generation Mexican-American family in Albuquerque, New Mexico.  Sánchez has a son, Nikko, born in 2001, from her relationship with former NFL tight end Tony Gonzalez. In August 2005, she married Patrick Whitesell, a Hollywood agent and founding partner of Endeavor talent agency. Sánchez has a son and daughter with Whitesell: Evan, born 2006, and Ella, born in 2008.

As early as 2018, she had an extramarital affair with businessman Jeff Bezos while they were both married, leading to his divorce from his wife MacKenzie to whom he’d been married for 25 years, before he founded Amazon. It also led to her divorce. 

In February 2019, Amazon founder Jeff Bezos published a blog post alleging that National Enquirer'' publisher American Media, Inc. had attempted blackmail and extortion in connection with Bezos' alleged affair with Sánchez. In April 2019, Sánchez and Whitesell filed for divorce, which was finalized in October of that year. In 2020, Sánchez was commonly described as Bezos' girlfriend.

Filmography

Sánchez has also made cameo appearances in films and television series, including in the following:

Film

Television

References

External links

 
 
 

1969 births
American film actresses
American infotainers
American reporters and correspondents
American sports announcers
Living people
Television anchors from Los Angeles
Participants in American reality television series
People from Albuquerque, New Mexico
Women sports announcers
American television personalities of Mexican descent
American women television journalists
American women aviators
Whitesell family
21st-century American women
American actresses of Mexican descent